Benjamin Lewis Fairchild (January 5, 1863 – October 25, 1946) was a U.S. Representative from New York.

Born in Sweden (near Rochester), Monroe County, New York, Fairchild attended the public schools of Washington, D.C., and a business college.  He was graduated from the law department of Columbian University (now George Washington University Law School) at Washington, D.C., in 1885.  He was admitted to the bar in 1885 and commenced practice in New York City.  He was employed in the draftsman division of the United States Patent Office 1877–1879. He served as clerk in the Bureau of Engraving and Printing 1879–1885.

Fairchild was elected as a Republican to the Fifty-fourth Congress (March 4, 1895 – March 3, 1897).
He unsuccessfully contested the election of William L. Ward to the Fifty-fifth Congress.  He resumed the practice of law in New York City.

Fairchild was elected to the Sixty-fifth Congress (March 4, 1917 – March 3, 1919). He was an unsuccessful candidate for reelection in 1918 to the Sixty-sixth Congress.

Fairchild was again elected to the Sixty-seventh Congress (March 4, 1921 – March 3, 1923). He was an unsuccessful candidate for reelection in 1922 to the Sixty-eighth Congress, but was subsequently elected to that Congress to fill the vacancy caused by the death of James V. Ganly.  He was reelected to the Sixty-ninth Congress and served from November 6, 1923, to March 3, 1927.  He was an unsuccessful candidate for reelection in 1926 to the Seventieth Congress.

He resumed the practice of law in New York City.  He died in Pelham Manor, New York, October 25, 1946. He was interred in Woodlawn Cemetery, Bronx, New York City.

References

External links
 
 

1863 births
1946 deaths
Politicians from Westchester County, New York
New York (state) lawyers
George Washington University Law School alumni
Burials at Woodlawn Cemetery (Bronx, New York)
People from Monroe County, New York
Republican Party members of the United States House of Representatives from New York (state)